Dick or Richard Hanley may refer to:

Dick Hanley (American football) (1894–1970), American football player and coach
Dick Hanley (swimmer) (born 1936), American swimmer
Richard Hanley, Zambian-born Australian philosopher